Immortal is a greatest hits album by Japanese visual kei rock band D'espairsRay. The album is a collection of their songs spanning from 1999-2008. The album contains 15 remastered tracks including their singles "Horizon" and "MaVERiCK". With the goal to make the best listening experience for the fans, all the songs were chosen by the band personally.

Track listing

References

D'espairsRay compilation albums
2009 compilation albums